Peters Township is a township in Kingman County, Kansas, USA.  As of the 2000 census, its population was 201.

Geography
Peters Township covers an area of 36.05 square miles (93.36 square kilometers); of this, 0.01 square miles (0.02 square kilometers) or 0.02 percent is water. The streams of Allen Creek, Cross Creek and Peters Creek run through this township.

Unincorporated towns
 Willowdale
(This list is based on USGS data and may include former settlements.)

Adjacent townships
 Union Township (north)
 Ninnescah Township (northeast)
 Belmont Township (east)
 Chikaskia Township (southeast)
 Rochester Township (south)
 Liberty Township (southwest)
 Kingman Township (west)
 Rural Township (northwest)

References
 U.S. Board on Geographic Names (GNIS)
 United States Census Bureau cartographic boundary files

External links
 US-Counties.com
 City-Data.com

Townships in Kingman County, Kansas
Townships in Kansas